Mount Mallis is a mountain,  high, midway between Mount Joyce and Mount Billing in the Prince Albert Mountains of Victoria Land, Antarctica. It was mapped by the United States Geological Survey from surveys and U.S. Navy air photos in 1956–62, and was named by the Advisory Committee on Antarctic Names for Robert R. Mallis, a geomagnetist/seismologist with the South Pole Station winter party, 1966.

References

Prince Albert Mountains
Mountains of Victoria Land
Scott Coast